Marco Rivera Miranda (born 20 April 1983 in Palma de Mallorca) is a Spanish former freestyle swimmer who competed in the 2004 Summer Olympics and in the 2008 Summer Olympics.

Notes

References

External links
 
 
 
 

1975 births
Living people
Spanish male freestyle swimmers
Olympic swimmers of Spain
Swimmers at the 2004 Summer Olympics
Swimmers at the 2008 Summer Olympics
Mediterranean Games bronze medalists for Spain
Mediterranean Games medalists in swimming
Swimmers at the 2009 Mediterranean Games